The PAX Association was a pro-communist Catholic organization created in 1947 in the People's Republic of Poland at the onset of the Stalinist period. The association published the Słowo Powszechne daily for almost fifty years between 1947 and 1993 with an average of 312 issues annually.

The first editor-in-chief of Słowo Powszechne (circulation: 40,000) was Wojciech Kętrzyński (d. 1983) from KN, grandson of historian Wojciech Kętrzyński. In 1982 the newspaper adjusted its name to Słowo Powszechne: dziennik Stowarzyszenia PAX (the "PAX Association Daily"). The publication closed only when the PAX ceased to function in 1993, following the collapse of communism; however, the facsimile of the association was reestablished in 1993 under a different name: the Catholic association "Civitas Christiana".

Notably, in 1953 the PAX gave its support to the Stalinist show trial of the Kraków Curia pronouncing death penalties for the Catholic priests accused of treason, and took over the publication of the Catholic weekly magazine Tygodnik Powszechny until the Polish October of 1956.

Communist era
Following the Soviet takeover, the PAX Association had been formed with the intention to undermine grass-roots support for the Roman Catholic Church in Stalinist Poland. Created by Bolesław Piasecki, it approved the trial and imprisonment of many Polish clergymen, among them Bishop Czesław Kaczmarek and Cardinal Stefan Wyszyński. PAX attempted to compete with the conservative clergy of the interwar era over public policy issues, especially after the arrest of hundreds of priests by the state security in early 1950s. The government gave it total control over the Polish branch of the Caritas relief organisation. According to Norman Davies PAX was an NKVD front organisation, set up to win over Polish Catholics to communism, and to break their links to the Vatican. It maintained a presence in the Sejm, winning, for example, five seats in the 1969 election.

Reforms
After 1956, together with many other similar government initiatives, it was toned down and took a more compromising position, in some regards even supporting the leniency for the anti-communist resistance in Poland, even though it firmly endorsed the communist government of the People's Republic of Poland until the fall of communism. After 1982 it was a member of the Patriotic Movement for National Rebirth. Throughout the decades after its creation and the death of Stalin, it continued to steadily lose power and influence, although it still exists in modern Poland.

Notable members
 Bolesław Piasecki
 Janusz Zabłocki
 Jan Dobraczyński
Tadeusz Mazowiecki

References

Organizations established in 1947
Polish People's Republic
History of Poland (1989–present)
History of Catholicism in Poland
1947 establishments in Poland
National Democracy
Christian socialism
Left-wing nationalism